‘Abd al-‘Azīz ibn Idrīs ibn Ḥasan ibn Abī Numayy was co-ruler of the Sharifate of Mecca with his cousin Nami ibn Abd al-Muttalib for three months in 1632.

After Nami captured Mecca on Wednesday, 17 March 1632 (25 Sha'ban 1041) he appointed Abd al-Aziz as his partner. Abd al-Aziz was entitled to one quarter of the Emirate, and his name was not included in the du‘a.

Abd al-Aziz fled Mecca with Nami on Tuesday, 22 June 1632 (4 Dhu al-Hijjah). On their way to the fortress of Turbah he separated from the group and went to Yanbu.

He died of plague in Egypt in 1652–1653 (1063 AH).

Notes

References
 
 
 
 

Banu Qatadah
Sharifs of Mecca
17th-century people from the Ottoman Empire
Arabs from the Ottoman Empire
17th-century Arabs